Reindeer Games (alternatively titled Deception) is a 2000 American action crime thriller film directed by John Frankenheimer in his final feature directorial outing before his 2002 death. It stars Ben Affleck, Gary Sinise, Charlize Theron, Dennis Farina, James Frain, Donal Logue, Danny Trejo and Clarence Williams III.

Reindeer Games was released by Miramax Films on February 25, 2000. It received generally negative critical reception and was a box office failure, grossing $32 million against a budget of $42 million.

Plot
Prison cellmates Nick Cassidy and Rudy Duncan are two days from release. Nick has been exchanging letters with a young woman named Ashley Mercer, although they have never met. Nick plans to meet Ashley as soon as he is released, while Rudy wants to join his family for Christmas. During a fight between the prisoners, Nick is killed while protecting Rudy. Upon release, Rudy pretends to be Nick in order to meet Ashley. They go to a diner then have sex in a cabin.

The two are kidnapped by Gabriel, Ashley’s gang leader brother. He tells Rudy that the gang, composed of Pug, Merlin, and Jumpy, are planning to rob a casino where Nick used to work before going to prison. Rudy protests that he is not Nick, but Ashley reveals that she wrote to him knowing Gabriel would use him for the robbery. Realizing that the gang will likely kill him if they find out he knows nothing about the casino, Rudy resumes the ruse.

Rudy devises a robbery plan based on Nick’s prison cell stories, and tells Gabriel the biggest loot is in the "PowWow safe" in manager Jack Bangs's office. Gabriel wants Rudy to draw a map of the casino, but Rudy claims that the casino has been remodeled. At the casino Rudy, dressed as a cowboy, snoops around to see any changes, and is almost caught by Jack Bangs but escapes by switching clothes with a college student. Merlin discovers that the casino was never remodeled and has been the same since it opened. Rudy runs with Ashley to a frozen lake pursued by Gabriel and his thugs shooting at them. Ashley falls through the ice and Rudy jumps in to rescue her. The thugs pull them out and are seen by an ice fisherman, whom Gabriel kills.

Gabriel throws darts at Rudy to get some answers and rants about his life as a truck driver. He decides to give Rudy a second chance at drawing the map. Later, Rudy stumbles upon Gabriel and Ashley in the pool area and learns they are not siblings, but lovers. The casino robbery doesn't go according to plan due to the inaccurate details of Rudy's map. Pug is killed in the count room.

Everyone meets in the manager's office. Gabriel introduces Rudy to Jack as Nick, but the manager recognizes him only as the cowboy from earlier and not as Nick. Gabriel, furious at Rudy’s deception, spares him for a moment when he demands to know where the "PowWow" safe is. When Jack opens the safe, he grabs guns from inside and kills Jumpy as the rest flee. Jack dies during the shootout while Rudy kills Merlin. Rudy is grabbed out the back door by Gabriel and Ashley who tie him up in their 18-wheeler truck.

The two plan to drive Rudy off the cliff in a burning car with some of the money, so it will be assumed the stolen money had been burned. Ashley shoots and kills Gabriel, then Nick appears, having staged his death earlier. Ashley's real name is revealed to be Millie Bobeck, and she was aware of Rudy's identity the whole time. Millie and Nick had collaborated to rob the casino using Rudy, Gabriel, and the gang. They tie Rudy to the steering wheel. Rudy produces a knife he had gotten earlier, cuts his bindings, hot wires the car, and reverses it, crushing Nick's legs. Millie desperately tries to shoot him but Rudy rams the burning car into her. He dives out as the car and Millie go over the cliff. Nick tries to convince Rudy to share the money, but Rudy locks him in the truck and sends it over the cliff.

Rudy picks up the cash and begins distributing it in mailboxes on the way home to his family, where he joins them for Christmas dinner.

Cast

In addition, some brief appearances include Ashton Kutcher, then starring in the sitcom That '70s Show, as a college student, while porn star Ron Jeremy (credited under his real name, Ron Hyatt) plays a prison inmate.

Production

Filming
The film was set in the Upper Peninsula of Michigan but was shot in Vancouver and Prince George, British Columbia, Canada. Shooting began on March 15, 1999.

Casting
Vin Diesel was originally cast as Pug, but had disagreements with John Frankenheimer in relation to the script and his character that led to him leaving the project before production began.

Release

Theatrical
The film was screened to test audiences who had a mixed response. This resulted in additional editing and some scenes being re-shot; the release date was pushed back from Christmas 1999 to February 2000.

Home media

The theatrical cut of the film was released on DVD in the US on August 8, 2000, and included an audio commentary by director John Frankenheimer. An extended director's cut, running 124 mins, was released on DVD in the US on March 27, 2001, including a new second audio commentary by Frankenheimer and additional deleted and alternate scenes. The Director's Cut was released on Blu-Ray on March 6, 2012.

Reception

Box office
On a $42 million budget, the film grossed $32.2 million worldwide.

Critical response
Reindeer Games received generally poor reviews and was not a commercial success. The review aggregator website Rotten Tomatoes reported that 25% of critics gave the film a positive review, based on a sample of 88 reviews, with an average score of 4.2/10. The site's critical consensus reads: "Despite a decent cast, subpar acting and a contrived plot disappointed reviewers". Metacritic, which assigns a weighted average score to reviews, gave a film rating of 37 out of 100, based on 33 critics, indicating "generally unfavorable reviews". Audiences polled by CinemaScore gave the film an average grade of "C−" on an A+ to F scale.

In a 2007 interview with Esquire, Charlize Theron said that she considered this movie as the worst film she ever did, saying that "Reindeer Games was not a good movie, but I did it because I loved John Frankenheimer". A CNN review said: "Reindeer Games isn't at the bottom of his creative barrel, but it's close".

See also
 List of Christmas films

References

External links

2000 action thriller films
2000 crime thriller films
American action thriller films
American crime thriller films
Films directed by John Frankenheimer
American Christmas films
Films set in Michigan
Films shot in Vancouver
American heist films
Dimension Films films
Films scored by Alan Silvestri
Films with screenplays by Ehren Kruger
2000s Christmas films
2000s English-language films
2000s American films